The 27th IBU Open European Championships were held in Raubichi, Belarus from 26 February to 1 March 2020. It was also a stage of the 2019–20 Biathlon IBU Cup.

Schedule
All times are local (UTC+3).

Results

Men

Women

Mixed

Medal table

References

External links
Official website 

2020
2020 in biathlon
2020 in Belarusian sport
International sports competitions hosted by Belarus
Sports competitions in Minsk
February 2020 sports events in Europe
March 2020 sports events in Europe